KAMM-LP, UHF analog channel 30, was a low-powered Tr3́s-affiliated television station licensed to Amarillo, Texas, United States. The station was owned by Northstar Media.

The station's license was cancelled by the Federal Communications Commission on June 9, 2014, for failure to file a license renewal application.

References

External links

AMM-LP
Television channels and stations established in 2005
Defunct television stations in the United States
Television channels and stations disestablished in 2014
2005 establishments in Texas
2014 disestablishments in Texas
AMM-LP